The Honourable Dudley Francis Fortescue (4 August 1820 – 2 March 1909) was a British Liberal politician.

Background
Fortescue was the third son of Hugh Fortescue, 2nd Earl Fortescue, and Lady Susan, daughter of Dudley Ryder, 1st Earl of Harrowby. His paternal grandmother Hester Grenville was the daughter of George Grenville. Hugh Fortescue, 3rd Earl Fortescue and the Hon. John Fortescue were his elder brothers. He was educated at the University of Oxford.

Political career
Fortescue was elected Member of Parliament for Andover in 1857, a seat he held until 1874. He was also a Commissioner in Lunacy, a Deputy Lieutenant of County Waterford and Devon and served as High Sheriff of County Waterford in 1870.

Family
Fortescue married his first cousin Lady Camilla Eleanor, daughter of Newton Fellowes, 4th Earl of Portsmouth and Lady Catherine Fortescue, in 1852. There were no children from the marriage. He died in March 1909, aged 88. His wife survived him by eleven years and died in August 1920.

References

1820 births
1909 deaths
Younger sons of earls
Deputy Lieutenants of Waterford
Deputy Lieutenants of Devon
High Sheriffs of County Waterford
UK MPs 1857–1859
UK MPs 1859–1865
UK MPs 1865–1868
UK MPs 1868–1874
Members of the Parliament of the United Kingdom for English constituencies
Dudley